Huachacalla is a small town in the Litoral Province of the Oruro Department in Bolivia. It is the seat of the Huachacalla Municipality.

References

Populated places in Oruro Department